Pasangkayu Regency is one of the six regencies which comprise West Sulawesi Province, Indonesia, on the island of Sulawesi. It covers an area of 3,043.75 km2 and had a population of 134,303 at the 2010 Census and 188,861 at the 2020 Census. The official estimate as at mid 2021 was 193,098. The town of Pasangkayu is the capital of the regency, and its only urban community (kelurahan).

History 
The regency was initially named North Mamuju Regency from its creation in 2003, until it was renamed as Pasangkayu Regency in March 2018.

Administrative districts 
The regency is divided into twelve districts (kecamatan), tabulated below from south to north with their areas and their populations at the 2010 Census and the 2020 Census, together with the official estimates as at mid 2021. The table also includes the locations of the district administrative centres, the number of administrative villages (62 rural desa and one urban kelurahan) in each district, and its postal code.

Climate
Pasangkayu has a tropical rainforest climate (Af) with heavy rainfall year-round.

References

Regencies of West Sulawesi